The 2011 French Super Series was a top level badminton competition contested from October 25, 2011 to October 30, 2011 in Paris, France. It was the tenth BWF Super Series competition on the 2011 BWF Super Series schedule. The total purse for the event was $200,000.

Men's singles

Seeds

  Lee Chong Wei (Champion)
  Lin Dan
  Chen Long
  Peter Gade
  Taufik Hidayat
  Chen Jin
  Nguyen Tien Minh
  Du Pengyu

Top half

Bottom half

Finals

Women's singles

Seeds

  Wang Yihan
  Wang Shixian
  Wang Xin
  Saina Nehwal
  Jiang Yanjiao
  Juliane Schenk
  Liu Xin
  Tine Baun

Top half

Bottom half

Finals

Men's doubles

Seeds

  Cai Yun / Fu Haifeng
  Jung Jae-sung / Lee Yong-dae
  Mathias Boe / Carsten Mogensen
  Ko Sung-hyun / Yoo Yeon-seong
  Koo Kien Keat / Tan Boon Heong
  Muhammad Ahsan / Bona Septano
  Markis Kido / Hendra Setiawan
  Chai Biao / Guo Zhendong

Top half

Bottom half

Finals

Women's doubles

Seeds

  Wang Xiaoli / Yu Yang
  Tian Qing / Zhao Yunlei
  Mizuki Fujii / Reika Kakiiwa
  Miyuki Maeda / Satoko Suetsuna
  Cheng Wen-hsing / Chien Yu-chin
  Ha Jung-eun / Kim Min-jung
  Shizuka Matsuo / Mami Naito
  Meiliana Jauhari / Greysia Polii

Top half

Bottom half

Finals

Mixed doubles

Seeds

  Zhang Nan (badminton) / Zhao Yunlei
  Xu Chen / Ma Jin
  Tontowi Ahmad / Liliyana Natsir
  Joachim Fischer Nielsen / Christinna Pedersen
  Sudket Prapakamol / Saralee Thungthongkam
  Chen Hung-ling / Cheng Wen-hsing
  Songphon Anugritayawon / Kunchala Voravichitchaikul
  Michael Fuchs / Birgit Michels

Top half

Bottom half

Finals

References

French Super Series
French
French Open (badminton)